The Sausage Factory, also known in the United States as MTV's Now What? or Much Ado About Whatever, is a teen sitcom that followed the lives of four friends in their junior year at West Boulder High School.

The four friends were Zack (Adam Brody), trying to win over his unrequited crush Lisa; Ted, the stereotypical rich kid who tries to consummate with his girlfriend, Nancy (Kristen Renton); J.C. (Kenny Fisher), who finds himself constantly approached by middle-aged women; and Gilby (Johnny Lewis), the class clown, who regularly creates trouble.

Produced in 2000 and 2001, it ran for one season. The single-camera series was shot without an audience and included no laugh track.

Originally aired in Canada on The Comedy Network, reruns were later screened on CTV and YTV. In the United Kingdom and Ireland, it airs on Trouble. Sky One previously aired it.

Cast
Adam Brody as Zack
Kenny Fisher as J.C.
Adam Nicholas Frost as Ted
Johnny K. Lewis as Gilby
Kristen Renton as Nancy
Andi Eystad as Lisa

Episodes

References

External links

  (unaired pilot, portions of its plot were incorporated into the episode titled "Purity Test")
 

MTV original programming
CTV Comedy Channel original programming
2000s American high school television series
2000s American teen sitcoms
2002 American television series debuts
2002 American television series endings
2000s Canadian high school television series
2000s Canadian teen sitcoms
2001 Canadian television series debuts
2002 Canadian television series endings
English-language television shows
Television series by Nelvana
Television shows filmed in Los Angeles
Television shows set in Vancouver
Television series about teenagers